Nanno is an extinct genus of Endocerid, named by Clarke in 1894 for the apical end of an endocerid from the Trenton Limestone of New York state that has the basic description of the nanno type (where the siphuncle swells to fill the entire apex of the shell, leaving septa and camerae to begin a few centimeters forward). It is possibly the senior synonym for Proterovaginoceras . As a valid genus, Nanno is included in the Endoceratidae but the nanno type apex may be found in other families.

References

 Clarke, J. M. (1897). The Lower Silurian Cephalopoda of Minnesota. In: E.O. Ulrich, J. M. Clarke, W. H. Scofield & N. H. Winchell  The Geology of Minnesota. Vol. III, Part II, of the final report. Paleontology. Harrison & Smith, Minneapolis. pp. 761–812.
 Flower, R. H. (1955). Status of Endoceroid Classification. Journal of Paleontology, Vol.20, no.5 May 1955,p. 329__. Abstract and Intro.  
 Teichert, C, (1964). Endoceratoidea;  Treatise on Invertebrate Paleontology, part K. Geol Soc of America and  Univ. Kansas Press.

Prehistoric nautiloid genera
Fossil taxa described in 1894